George Arnold Haynes Safroni-Middleton, also known as Count Safroni (3 September 1873 – 7 November 1950) was a British composer, director, violinist, harpist, writer and amateur astronomer. For several works he used the pseudonym William H. Myddleton.

Biography 
Safroni-Middleton was born in Kent. He studied violin with Pablo de Sarasate and afterwards started performing as violinist. He played the violin in the Orchestra of "Her Majesty's Theatre" in Sydney, the Orchestra of the Opera House in Auckland, the Providence Opera House in Providence (Rhode Island), the Tokyo Orchestra, the Government House (Sarawak) Orchestra and the Government House (Hayti) Mexico Orchestra. As solo performer he toured around Australia, South America, Italy and Spain.

Later he became bandmaster of the Orchestra of the Carl Rosa Opera Company in London.

As a writer he wrote many novels, travel guides and poems. He explored Borneo, Papua New Guinea and Malaysia.

As a composer he is mainly known for his marches and dance music for the harmony orchestra. His best known piece is probably Imperial Echoes (1913), which for many years was the theme of Radio Newsreel on BBC radio.

He died in Streatham and was buried at West Norwood Cemetery on 10 November 1950, age 77.

Compositions

Works for orchestra 
 Imperial Echoes (BBC Radio Newsreel march)
 The Leek - A Selection of Welsh Melodies published by Boosey and Hawkes early 20th c.
 The Rose - A Selection of English Melodies published by Boosey and Hawkes early 20th c.
 The Shamrock - A Selection of Irish Melodies published by Boosey and Hawkes early 20th c.

Works for harmony orchestra 
 American President, march
 Boys of The Old Brigade
 By Imperial Command, march
 By Order of the King, march
 Call of the Empire, march
 Chanson de la Nuit, entr'acte
 Down South
 Firenze, waltz
 House of Hanover, march
 Imperial Echoes, march
 Imperial March, march
 King's Cavalier, march
 Light of the Regiment
 Men of the Mist, march
 Negro dream
 Salute the Standard, march
 Samoan Love Waltz
 Sierra Leone, march
 The Dashing British, march
 The Last Tryst, concert waltz
 The Monk's Dream
 The Night Riders, march
 The Phantom Brigade, march
 The Relief, march
 The Shamrock
 The Scottish Thistle
 The Stronghold, march

Stage plays 
 La Foresta, musical comedy
 Gabrielle, musical comedy

Publications 
 Bush Songs and Oversea Voices, including Songs of the South Sea Islands, Australia, Etc., London, John Long, 1914, 159 p.
 Sailor and Beachcomber: Confessions of a Life at Sea, in Australia and amid the Islands of the Pacific, Grant Richards, London, UK, 1915, 304 p.
 A Vagabond's Odyssey: Being Further Reminiscences of a Wandering Sailor-Troubadour in Many Lands, Dodd & Mead, 1916, 328 p.
 Wine Dark Seas and Tropic Skies: Reminiscences and a Romance of the South Seas, Grant Richards, London, UK, 1918
 Gabrielle of the Lagoon: A Romance of the South Seas, The Solomon Isles. J.B. Lippincott Co., Philadelphia/London, 1919, 286 p.
 South Sea Foam: The Romantic Adventures of a Modern Don Quixote in the Southern Seas, George H. Doran, 1920, 350 p.
 Sestrina: A Romance of the South Seas, George H. Doran, 1920, 256 p.
 No Extradition, Ward, Lock & Co., 1923
 Tropic Shadows: Memories of the South Seas, Together with Reminiscences of the Author's Sea Meetings with Joseph Conrad, London: The Richards Press, 1927, 302 p.
 Two Faces in Borneo: A Drama of a Dual Personality, London, The Richards Press, 1928
 Tides of Sunrise and Sunset: The Fourth Dimension of Romance, London: Heath Cranton, 1932. 219 p.
 In the Green Leaf: A Chapter of Autobiography, London: Fortune Press, 1950, 199 p.
 Australian Bush Lyrics

Bibliography 
 Wolfgang Suppan, Armin Suppan: Das Neue Lexikon des Blasmusikwesens, 4th edition, Freiburg-Tiengen, Blasmusikverlag Schulz GmbH, 1994, 
 Paul E. Bierley, William H. Rehrig: The heritage encyclopedia of band music : composers and their music, Westerville, Ohio: Integrity Press, 1991, 
 Norman E. Smith: March music notes, Lake Charles, La.: Program Note Press, 1986, 
 John L. Adams: Musicians' autobiographies - An annotated bibliography of writings available in English, 1800 to 1980, Jefferson, North Carolina: McFarland, 1982, 126p.
 Leslie Gilbert Pine: Who's who in music, First post-war edition (1949–50), London: Shaw Publishing, 1950, 419 p.
 Sir Landon Ronald: Who's who in music, London: Shaw Publishing, 1937

External links 

 
 
 Biographical website
 William H. Myddleton at the Internet Movie Database

British male conductors (music)
British harpists
British writers
British violinists
British male violinists
19th-century British composers
20th-century British composers
1873 births
1950 deaths
Burials at West Norwood Cemetery
20th-century British conductors (music)
20th-century British male musicians
19th-century British male musicians